Dundee United Football Club is a professional football club based in Dundee, Scotland. Since being formed in 1909 as Dundee Hibernian, the club has employed a manager to run the team, the first being Pat Reilly. The club's longest serving and most successful manager is Jim McLean, who held the position from 1971 to 1993 and won three major honours – the Scottish Football League Premier Division title in 1982-83 and consecutive Scottish League Cup wins in 1979 and 1980. Two Dundee United managers have won the Scottish Cup – Ivan Golac in 1994 and Peter Houston in 2010.

Managerial history

Dundee Hibernian's first manager, Pat Reilly, had no previous background in professional football, but was one of a group of local businessmen who had set up the club. Initially the role was "secretary-manager", with the emphasis as much on the administrative business of the club as on running the football team. Reilly had a flair for publicity, and under him the club successfully applied for membership of the Scottish Football League in 1910. Apart from a two-year spell during the First World War when he was replaced by the club's first player-manager, Herbert Dainty, Reilly remained in the role until 1922, shortly before the club was reorganised as Dundee United.

Former Scotland goalkeeper Jimmy Brownlie was the club's most successful manager in the interwar period. He had three spells in charge, the last as co-manager with Sam Irving. Under Brownlie, United won the Division Two title in the 1924-25 season, their first national honour, and entered the top flight of Scottish football for the first time. Although relegated in 1927, they won the Second Division again in 1928-29 and were promoted for a third time in 1930-31, shortly before the end of Brownlie's first spell as manager.

Prior to the appointment of former player Jerry Kerr as manager in 1959, Dundee United had spent only four seasons in Division One, and had been absent from it since 1932. After winning promotion in Kerr's first season in charge, the club became established in the top flight of Scottish football, and between 1960 and 2016 spent only one season below it. Under Kerr, United reached their first major national semi-final in 1963 and qualified for European competition for the first time in 1966, recording a notable victory over Fairs Cup holders Barcelona. Kerr retired as manager in 1971, to be replaced by Jim McLean.

Building on Kerr's achievements, McLean instituted a successful youth policy that set the foundations for future success. The club won their first major honour, the Scottish League Cup, in 1979 and retained the trophy in 1980. The club became champions of Scotland for the first time when they won the Scottish Football League Premier Division title in 1982-83. During the 1980s, McLean's United teams regularly made significant progress in European competitions, reaching the European Cup semi-finals in 1984 and the UEFA Cup final in 1987. Under McLean, however, Dundee United developed a reputation for failing in major finals at Hampden Park; he never won the Scottish Cup, losing six finals, whilst there were also two League Cup final defeats.
 
McLean spent 21 years as manager of Dundee United until his retirement in 1993, becoming the club's longest serving manager. At that point, the club had had only two managers in a 34-year period, but since then have had a much higher turnover. Liam Fox, appointed in 2022, is the club's twentieth manager or head coach in the 29 years since McLean. Up until 2000, McLean himself had chosen his successors, having become club chairman in 1988 and initially combining this role with that of manager, a unique situation in Scottish football. His immediate successor, Ivan Golac, won the previously elusive Scottish Cup in 1994, but he left the club the following year shortly before United were relegated after 35 years in the top flight. Promotion back to the Premier Division was won under Billy Kirkwood, who was followed as manager by Tommy McLean, the chairman's brother. Dundee United won the Scottish Cup for a second time in 2010, under Peter Houston. Other managers to have taken the club to major cup finals are Tommy McLean, Gordon Chisholm, Craig Levein and Jackie McNamara.

Following another relegation from the top flight in 2016, Ray McKinnon led the team to win the Challenge Cup for lower division clubs in 2017. Promotion back to the Premiership was achieved under Robbie Neilson in 2019-20, with United declared champions in a season cut short by the COVID-19 pandemic.

List
Managerial dates are sourced from Rundo & Watson (2009) and Soccerbase. Statistics are taken from the Arab Archive website and include all national and international competitions. Matches in unofficial wartime competitions played during the Second World War are included, but otherwise minor and local competitions (such as the Forfarshire Cup) are not; nor are matches that were abandoned or declared void, for example matches in the abandoned 1939-40 Scottish League season. Statistics are correct as of the match played on 4 March 2023.

Notes

References

Sources

Managers
 
Dundee United
Dundee United F.C.-related lists